

Ælfred or Alfred (died 953–956) was an Anglo-Saxon Bishop of Selsey. Ælfred attests charters from 943 to 953. In 945 he received a grant of land from Edmund I. Ælfred died between 953 and 956.

Citations

References

External links
 ; see also 

Bishops of Selsey
10th-century English bishops
950s deaths
Year of birth unknown
Year of death uncertain